Gujarat State Fertilizers & Chemicals Limited (GSFC) is an Indian chemicals and fertilizers manufacturer, owned by the Government of Gujarat. GSFC was founded in 1962 and has its headquarters in Vadodara on the Ahmedabad Vadodara Expressway. As of fiscal year 2021–22, fertilizers such as diammonium phosphate, ammonium sulfate and urea generated over 60% of the company's revenue, while industrial products including caprolactam, nylon 6, melamine and MEK oxime contributed the remaining share.

Oil and gas discovered in Bombay High and South Basin triggered the birth of 8 new generation fertilizer plants to fulfill the growing food needs of India. In 1976, it set up a plant in Bharuch which trades as Gujarat Narmada Valley Fertilisers & Chemicals, as a subsidiary of GSFC.

In 2012, GSFC incorporated a wholly-owned subsidiary called GSFC AgroTech Limited (GATL).

See also
 GSFC Complex INA

References

External links
 Gujarat State Fertilizers & Chemicals Limited website
 Gujarat Narmada Valley Fertilizers & Chemicals Limited website 

Companies based in Vadodara
Fertilizer companies of India
Chemical companies of India
Companies listed on the Bombay Stock Exchange
Companies listed on the National Stock Exchange of India
1962 establishments in Gujarat
Indian companies established in 1962
Chemical companies established in 1962